Zhan Guojun (born ) is a Chinese male volleyball player. He is part of the China men's national volleyball team. On club level he plays for Shanghai Golden Age.

References

External links
 profile at FIVB.org

1988 births
Living people
Chinese men's volleyball players
Volleyball players at the 2018 Asian Games
Asian Games competitors for China
21st-century Chinese people